Le Maître de pension is a 1973 French film directed by Marcel Moussy.

Cast
 Maurice Garrel - Romeyre
 Pascal Bressy - Michaël
 Pierre Tornade - Jaminet
 Isabelle Huppert - Annie
 Fernand Berset - Berbet
 Pascale de Boysson - Blanche
 Daniel Martin - Ramusot
 Patrick de Backer - Filasse
 Franck Dubreuil - Tatane
 Roland Demongeot - Grand Pierre
 Muse Dalbray - Pascaline
 Hélène Legrand - Angélique
 Louis Bugette - Ferrier
 Andrée Damant - Fernande Cormat
 Marius Laurey - Cormat
 Bernard Dumaine - Crèvecoeur
 Georgs Lucas - Degornur
 Dominique Vozel - Louise
 Georgina Lefebvre - Lisa
 Giu Gam - Une voisine
 Jo Charrier - Laurioux

See also
 Isabelle Huppert on screen and stage

References

External links

1973 films
French television films
1970s French-language films
Films directed by Marcel Moussy
1970s French films